The Clarion Herald is the official newspaper of the Archdiocese of New Orleans.

Description 
The stated mission of the Clarion Herald is to chronicle the activities and events of local church parishes around the Archdiocese. However, the newspaper also functions as an outlet for editorials by the Archbishop of New Orleans and other leaders in the Catholic church. The newspaper frequently publishes articles on controversial subjects, such as abortion and the priest abuse scandals. The newspaper typically promotes the official archdiocesan views on such subjects.

History 
The creation of the Clarion Herald was authorized by Archbishop John Cody.  The first issue was published on February 28, 1963. 

It is affiliated with the Catholic Media Association. The newspaper is published weekly and is available free of charge to parishioners in local churches throughout the Greater New Orleans Area. 

After Hurricane Katrina made landfall in New Orleans on August 28, 2005, publication of the newsletter ceased for a month and resumed on October 1, 2005. The newspaper extensively covered the recovery effort in all parishes in the New Orleans area.

The Clarion Herald was previously published online in HTML format from 1999 to August 2005 and has since been published online in PDF format, in print, and online.

References  
 Clarion Herald Online 
 Archived editions of the Clarion Herald

Catholic newspapers published in the United States
Newspapers published in New Orleans
Newspapers established in 1963
1963 establishments in Louisiana
Roman Catholic Archdiocese of New Orleans